Elachista pullicomella is a moth of the family Elachistidae. It is found in most of  Europe (except Great Britain, Ireland, the Iberian Peninsula and the Balkan Peninsula), east into Russia.

Recorded food plants include Arrhenatherum, Avena, Calamagrostis epigejos, Dactylis glomerata, Deschampsia caespitosa, Deschampsia flexuosa, Elymus repens, Festuca ovina, Festuca rubra, Festuca trachyphylla, Helictotrichon sedenense, Holcus lanatus, Phleum, Poa annua, Poa pratensis and Trisetum flavescens. They create a translucent, whitish mine that often takes the entire width of the blade. The mine is made in the upper section of the leaf, starting at the tip. The frass is concentrated in the oldest, highest, part of the mine.

References

pullicomella
Moths described in 1839
Moths of Europe